Chare Phuthong or stage name Santi Duangsawang was a Thai luk thung singer, his popular music includes "" and "".

Early life and career
He was born on January 10, 1968, in Sak Lek district, Phichit province. In his young years, he contested many contests on stage and won more, until Aed Tewada saw his prominence. Aed  induced him to start on stage in 1985 and recorded first song title Mae Ja Phor Yu Nai but failed to find fame. In 1986, he contested  music contest "Look thung sip thit" and registered as artist in RS Public Company Limited. He came to fame with his album Kiss No Fun (Chup Mai Wan) in 1988. He retired RS in 2008 and founded record label by himself called Ruangkhaw Record.

He died from diabetes and kidney failure on November 4, 2016, in Samut Songkhram province, aged 48.

Discography

Popular Music
 Kiss no fun.
 Change oaths.
 Poor singer.
 This love is serious.
 The undisciplined girl.

References

1968 births
2016 deaths
Santi Duangsawang
Santi Duangsawang
Santi Duangsawang
Deaths from diabetes
Deaths from kidney failure
Santi Duangsawang